The Attorney General's Office of Brunei is the public prosecutor of Brunei, and legal adviser to the Government of Brunei. The functions of the attorney general are carried out with the assistance of the deputy attorney-general and the solicitor-general, through the Attorney General's Chambers (AGC). Moreover, assisting the Royal Brunei Police Force (RBPF) and other enforcement agencies in carrying out their investigations, advising and approving prosecutions.

History 
was established by the Constitution in 1959. Prior to the proclamation, the Attorney General of Sarawak had served as the legal adviser to Brunei's federal government. The Attorney General is assisted by the Solicitor General and Counsels in advising representing the federal government in civil and criminal matters. In addition, the Attorney General drafts legislation and works closely with any pertinent government ministries and departments. In August 2008, the position of attorney general was promoted to ministerial rank.

Attorney generals

See also 

 Attorney general
 Justice ministry
 Politics of Brunei

References 

Government of Brunei
Attorneys general
Justice ministries